George J. Ziegler (1872 – July 22, 1916) was a professional baseball pitcher. He appeared in one game in Major League Baseball for the Pittsburgh Alleghenys in 1890. He started the game and pitched six innings, getting the loss and allowing seven runs for an earned run average of 10.50.

Death
He died from a sunstroke in 1916.

References

External links

Major League Baseball pitchers
Pittsburgh Alleghenys players
Sacramento Altas players
Wheeling National Citys players
Wheeling Nailers (baseball) players
Sacramento Senators players
Olean (minor league baseball) players
Mansfield Electricians players
Staunton Hayseeds players
Newport News-Hampton Deckhands players
Lynchburg Hill Climbers players
St. Joseph Reds players
Austin Senators players
19th-century baseball players
1872 births
1916 deaths
Baseball players from Chicago